The William H. Phipps House is a historic house located in Hudson, Wisconsin.  It was added to the National Register of Historic Places on June 18, 1987.

Its NRHP nomination states:The William H. Phipps house epitomizes fanciful Queen Anne architecture with its octagonal tower, multiple verandahs and balconies and exterior facade ornamentation using octagonal shingles and various applied wood detail. The interior complements the architectural quality using hardwoods, often carved in the minutest detail. The elegant Queen Anne style home built in 1884, is one of the showplaces in Hudson and continues to be one of the finest examples of the style of architecture to be found in the St. Croix Valley.

In 2018 it serves as Phipps Inn Bed & Breakfast.

References

External links
Phipps Inn Bed & Breakfast: About

Houses completed in 1884
Houses in St. Croix County, Wisconsin
Houses on the National Register of Historic Places in Wisconsin
Queen Anne architecture in Wisconsin
National Register of Historic Places in St. Croix County, Wisconsin